Sciapus wiedemanni is a species of fly in the family Dolichopodidae. It is widely distributed across Europe. It has also been introduced to Washington, United States and Ontario, Canada.

References

External links
Images representing Sciapus at BOLD

Sciapodinae
Insects described in 1823
Asilomorph flies of Europe
Taxa named by Carl Fredrik Fallén